Engle may refer to:

Places in the United States
 Engle, New Mexico, an unincorporated community
 Engle, Texas, an unincorporated community
 Engle, West Virginia, an unincorporated community
 Engle Lake, a seasonal lake in New Mexico

Other uses
 Engle (surname)
 Fred S. Engle Middle School, West Grove, Pennsylvania, United States
 Engle, Old English for the Angles, a people who settled in Great Britain after the fall of the Western Roman Empire

See also
 Engels (disambiguation)
 Engel (disambiguation)